Sarbor-e Jadid (also Romanized as Sarbor-e Jadīd; also known as Sarbor) is a village in Sanjabi Rural District, Kuzaran District, Kermanshah County, Kermanshah Province, Iran. At the 2006 census, its population was 126, in 30 families.

References 

Populated places in Kermanshah County